The Metro State Roadrunners are the athletic teams that represent Metropolitan State University of Denver. The Roadrunners participate in 15 intercollegiate sports and compete in the Division II Rocky Mountain Athletic Conference.

History
Metro State has produced 239 All-Americans and was one of the seven charter members of the Colorado Athletic Conference in 1989 before joining the Rocky Mountain Athletic Conference in 1996. Metro State competed as a NAIA member until 1983, when the Roadrunners jumped to the NCAA Division II ranks. Since 1998, Metro State has captured 32 regular season conference titles, 35 conference tournament championships, as well as the 2000 & 2002 NCAA Division II Men's Basketball National Championships and the 2004 and 2006 NCAA Division II Women's Soccer national crowns. Metro State also boasts five individual national championships. Men's swimmer Darwin Strickland won national championships in the 50 yard freestyle and 100 yard freestyle in 1995 and also won the 100 free in 1996. Anthony Luna won men's track championships in the 800 meters during the indoor and outdoor seasons in 2009. Metro State's main rivals are Colorado School of Mines, Fort Lewis College, and Regis University.

A new 12.5 acre complex will be the home site for six of the Roadrunners’ 15 sports, including, baseball, softball, men's and women's soccer, and men's and women's tennis. The site of the new athletic complex will be located south of the Colfax viaduct adjacent to Shoshone Street, east of I-25. In addition to hosting the athletic and academic programs, the University will host activities for the
community's youth. The baseball, softball and soccer fields will be synthetic turf surfaces.

The 2016 Division II National Championships Festival will mark the ninth occurrence of the distinctive Division II event, and will be hosted by Metro State University-Denver and the Denver Sports Commission, May 16–21, 2016. 76 qualifying teams and 20 qualifying individuals will represent their institutions by competing for national championships in men's and women's golf, women's lacrosse, softball, and men's and women's tennis.

NCAA

Runners Up
1999 Men's Basketball
2013 Men's Basketball

Final Four
2002 Women's Soccer
2004 Men's Basketball
2008 Women's Soccer
2010 Women's Softball
2014 Men's Basketball

Regional host 
Cross Country: 1995, 2011
Men's Basketball: 2000, 2004, 2005, 2013, 2014
National Championships Festival: 2016
Women's Soccer: 2003, 2004, 2005, 2006, 2008
Women's Volleyball: 2001, 2003

NCAA individual champions
1995 Darwin Strickland (Men's Swimming/50 Free)
1995 Darwin Strickland (Men's Swimming/100 Free)
1996 Darwin Strickland (Men's Swimming/100 Free)
2009 Anthony Luna (Men's Indoor Track/800 meters)
2009 Anthony Luna (Men's Outdoor Track/800 meters)

RMAC

† Tournament champions

‡ Regular season & Tournament champions

RMAC All-Sports Cup
The RMAC All-Sports Competition Cup is awarded to the institution which accumulates the most points over the year based on its teams' outcome in the RMAC's four core sports, along with six wildcard sports. The four core sports are football or men's soccer, men's basketball, women's basketball and volleyball, while the six wild card sports consist of three men's sports and three women's sports, which are designated by that institutions' best finish in those 16 Olympic sports (21 total RMAC sports). Total RMAC All-Sports Competition Cup points are calculated based on how the teams finish in the RMAC regular season standings. In the scenario where teams do not have regular season standings, conference championship results are used.

Sports

Metro State has produced 239 All-Americans and was one of the seven charter members of the Colorado Athletic Conference in 1989 before joining the Rocky Mountain Athletic Conference in 1996. Metro State competed as a NAIA member until 1983, when the Roadrunners jumped to the NCAA Division II ranks. Since 1998, Metro State has captured 32 regular season conference titles, 35 conference tournament championships, as well as the 2000 & 2002 NCAA Division II Men's Basketball National Championships and the 2004 and 2006 NCAA Division II Women's Soccer national crowns. Metro State also boasts five individual national championships. Men's swimmer Darwin Strickland won national championships in the 50 yard freestyle and 100 yard freestyle in 1995 and also won the 100 free in 1996. Anthony Luna won men's track championships in the 800 meters during the indoor and outdoor seasons in 2009.
Pep Band

Men's & Women's teams
Basketball
Cross country
Soccer
Tennis
Track and field (indoor and outdoor)

Men's sports
Baseball

Women's sports
Softball
Volleyball
 Golf

Facilities
Auraria Events Center - Basketball/Volleyball
Auraria Field - Baseball/Soccer/Softball
 CommonGround Golf Course, Green Valley Ranch Golf Club - Women's Golf
Roadrunners Athletic Complex (construction phase)
World Indoor Airport

Club sports

Baseball
Capoeira
Cheer and dance
Cycling
Fencing
Fishing
Football
Men's ice hockey
Inline hockey
Lacrosse
Martial arts and self defense
Rock climbing
Men's soccer
Squash
Swimming and diving
Taekwando
Ultimate Frisbee
Men's volleyball

Rivals
Colorado School of Mines
Fort Lewis College
Regis University
United States Air Force Academy
Colorado Mesa University

Camps and clinics
Metro State Soccer Camps

Roadrunners in the Pros

Active

Brandon Jefferson SIG Strasbourg France

Retired

Roadrunner Olympians

References

External links